Ephraim Reinhold Seehl (died after 1790) was an apothecary and chemist of German background, born in Sweden. He was known as a manufacturer of green vitriol.

Life
He was the son of Captain Reinhold Seehl (d. 1721), a German volunteer who worked his way through the ranks in the Swedish army. He settled in England and was naturalised as a British subject by Act of Parliament introduced in 1783 (23 Geo c. 8).

Seehl occurs in a London subscription list in 1757. He was one of just three people with addresses in Poplar and Blackwall to be found in Thomas Mortimer's Universal Director of 1763. There his entry reads "Seehl, Ephraim Rinhold, Copperas Merchant, Blackwall; or at the Bank Coffee-house, Threadneedlestreet." At this time he was leasing the Copperas Works in Bromley from his brother-in-law, the shipwright John Perry of Blackwall Yard.

Seehl traveled widely in Europe. He was a subscriber to Mineralogia Cornubiensis (1778) by William Pryce. His autograph book shows that he was almost certainly a Rosicrucian.

Seehl's will was proved 12 September 1783.

Publications
Seehl worked on the compounds of sulphur. The distinction of its acids, and sulphur dioxide, was not clarified at this point. The preparation of sulphuric acid was known by the beginning of the 17th century. With Augustus Sala, Nicolas Lemery and J. C. Bernhardt, Seehl is mentioned as one of those working on methods for its production. The method of making it by heating sulphur with saltpetre has been attributed to him.

Seehl published An Easy Method of Procuring the Volatile Acid of Sulphur in Philosophical Transactions in 1744. It referred to the preparation of sulphurous acid.

 A new improvement in the art of making the true volatile spirit of sulphur (1744). Seehl was mentioned for this work in Johann Friedrich Gmelin's Geschichte der Chemie.
 A short treatise upon the art and mystery of making of copperas (1768)

References 

Year of birth unknown
18th-century English chemists
1783 deaths
Naturalised citizens of the United Kingdom
German emigrants to England
18th-century German chemists